Varash urban territorial hromada is a hromada located in Ukraine's western Rivne Oblast. The administrative centre of the hromada is the city of Varash.

The hromada was previously an amalgamated hromada.

Settlements 
In addition to the capital city of Varash, there are 17 settlements in the hromada, of which all are villages:
 
 
 
 
 
 
 
 
 
 
 
 
 
 
 
 Stara Rafalivka

History 
On 15 January 2023, the Varash urban hromada was one of nine hromadas in Rivne Oblast to receive a bus and humanitarian aid from German bus company Meso and More. According to Vitaliy Koval, Governor of Rivne Oblast, the bus was given to local educational institutions for transportation of students and teachers.

References 

Hromadas of Rivne Oblast